Whittlesea Football Club is a local Australian rules football club in Whittlesea, Victoria, on the outer suburbs of Melbourne playing in the Northern Football League.

From the club's inception until the 1970s, Whittlesea wore navy guernseys with gold band and trim. Now it wears dark blue with an eagle and wing on the front similar to the West Coast Eagles AFL side.

In 2019 the club entered a team into the AFL Masters League as an over 35s Superules team under the same club name and colours.

In 2020 the club entered the first Senior Women's team at Whittlesea after a successful decade of Junior Girls development which seen Chloe Molloy having a successful career which continues for Collingwood in the AFLW.

Timeline of different leagues 

1904 – Whittlesea was a founding club of the Whittlesea DFA.

1906 – Whittlesea played in the Bourke-Evelyn FL

1933 – Whittlesea played in the Panton Hill & DFL

1934 – Whittlesea played in the Diamond Valley FL

1940 – Whittlesea played in the Panton Hill & DFL

1946 – Whittlesea played in the Diamond Valley FL

1947 – Whittlesea played in the Panton Hill FL

1987 – Whittlesea played in the Riddell DFL

Whittlesea changed name to Northern Eagles FC.

1992 – Whittlesea played in the Diamond Valley FL (now Northern Football League), and changed the name back to the Whittlesea Football Club

Premierships 17 
1907 – Bourke-Evelyn FL
1923 – Bourke-Evelyn FL
1924 – Bourke-Evelyn FL
1925 – Bourke-Evelyn FL
1932 – Panton Hill & District Football Association
1954 – Panton Hill & District Football Association
1957 – Panton Hill & District Football Association
1958 – Panton Hill & District Football Association
1959 – Panton Hill & District Football Association
1960 – Panton Hill & District Football Association
1973 – Panton Hill FL
1974 – Panton Hill FL
1988 – Riddell DFL Division Two as Northern Eagles
2010 – Northern Football League Division Two - 2010 Northern Football League Division Two Grand Final played at Preston City Oval 11 September Whittlesea 9.17.71 defeated Lower Plenty 9.3.57   
2013 – Northern Football League Division Two - 2013 Northern Football League Division Two Grand Final played at Preston City Oval 14 September Whittlesea 17.14.116 defeated Fitzroy Stars 14.13.97
2015 - Northern Football League Division Two - 2015 Northern Football League Division Two Grand Final played at Preston City Oval 12 September Whittlesea 14.13.97 defeated Lalor 14.10.94
2019 - Northern Football League Division Two - 2019 Northern Football League Division Two Grand Final played at Preston City Oval 14 September Whittlesea 10.14.74 defeated Banyule 6.11.47

References

Australian rules football clubs established in 1904
Northern Football League (Australia) clubs
1904 establishments in Australia
Sport in the City of Whittlesea
Australian rules football clubs in Melbourne